Adoor Bhavani (1927 – 25 October 2009) was an Indian actress in Malayalam cinema, best known for her appearance in the National Award-winning film Chemmeen (1965), directed by Ramu Kariat. She had acted in about 450 films, including Mudiyanaya Puthran, Thulabharam, Kallichellamma, and Anubhavangal Paalichakal. Her last film was K. Madhu-directed Sethurama Iyer CBI. She was also a stage actress and was associated with popular theatre group KPAC.

Bhavani was born in Adoor in Travancore. Her sister, Adoor Pankajam, was also a Malayalam film actress. Adoor Bhavani died on 25 October 2009.

Awards and recognitions

In 1969, Bhavani won the Kerala state film award for the second best actress for the film Kallichellamma. She received the Kerala Sangeetha Nataka Akademi Award for Drama in 1982. She was awarded the Chalachithra Saparya Lifetime Achievement award by Mathrubhumi-Medimix in 2002. In 2008, Kerala Sangeetha Nataka Academy honoured Bhavani and Pankajam for their overall contributions to theatre and drama.

Filmography

Dramas
Veluthampi Dalawa
Mooladhanam
Ashwamedham
Thulabharam
Mudiyanaya Puthran
Yudhakandam
Parithranayam
Pamsula
Rangapooja
Paashupathrasthram
Penal Code
Chakravarthini
Paadam Onnu
Anyayam

See also
National Film Awards
Chemmeen

References

External links

Adoor Bhavani at MSI
Adoor Bhavani cremated with State honours, from The Hindu

1927 births
2009 deaths
Actresses from Kerala
Indian film actresses
Kerala State Film Award winners
People from Pathanamthitta district
Actresses in Malayalam cinema
Women of the Kingdom of Travancore
People of the Kingdom of Travancore
20th-century Indian actresses
21st-century Indian actresses
Indian stage actresses
Actresses in Malayalam theatre
Recipients of the Kerala Sangeetha Nataka Akademi Award